Hackelia bella is a species of flowering plant in the borage family known by the common name greater showy stickseed.

It is native to the northern California Coast Ranges and the Klamath Mountains in northeastern California and southwestern Oregon in the United States. It is found in yellow pine forest, red fir forest habitats.

Description
Hackelia bella is a sprawling perennial herb grows hairy stems to about half a meter in height. The base of the plant is surrounded by many long, thin oval-shaped leaves up to about 26 centimeters long each. Leaves farther up the stem are similar but shorter and the tops of the stems have few leaves.

The small flowers have five lobes with a small petallike appendage at the base of each lobe. The flowers are usually white. The fruit is a nutlet 5 or 6 millimeters wide.

External links
 Calflora Database: Hackelia bella (Greater showy stickseed)
Jepson Manual eFlora (TJM2) treatment of Hackelia bella
UC CalPhotos gallery

bella
Flora of California
Flora of Oregon
Flora of the Klamath Mountains
Natural history of the California Coast Ranges
Flora without expected TNC conservation status